Peeters is a Dutch-language patronymic surname, equivalent to Peters. It is the most common surname in Belgium (33,275 people), and is particularly common in the province of Antwerp, but also in Flemish Brabant and Belgian Limburg. Notable people with the surname include:

Artists

Bonaventura Peeters the Elder (1614-1652), Flemish marine and landscape painter 
Bonaventura Peeters the Younger (1641-1702), Flemish marine and landscape painter 
Catharina Peeters (1615-1676), Flemish marine painter 
Clara Peeters (1594-1657), Flemish still life painter
Gillis Peeters the Elder (1612 – 1653), Flemish painter
Frank Peeters (born 1947), Belgian fine art photographer
Hendrik Peeters (1815–1869), Belgian sculptor
Henk Peeters (1925–2013), Dutch artist
Jacob Balthasar Peeters (c. 1655 – after 1721), Flemish painter
Jan Peeters I (1624-1677), Flemish marine painter 
Jozef Peeters (1895-1960), Belgian painter, engraver and graphic artist
Maarten Peeters (c. 1500-1566), Flemish painter and print publisher

Athletes

Alfons Peeters (1943–2015), Belgian footballer
Bob Peeters (born 1974), Belgian football striker
Francine Peeters (born 1957), Belgian long-distance runner
Frans Peeters (born 1956), Belgian sports shooter
Huguette Peeters (born 1936), Belgian swimmer
Jacky Peeters (born 1969), Belgian football defender
Jelena Peeters (born 1985), Belgian speed skater
Kevin Peeters (born 1987), Belgian road bicycle racer
Ludo Peeters (born 1953), Belgian road bicycle racer
Maurice Peeters (1882–1957), Dutch track cyclist
Pete Peeters (born 1957), Canadian ice hockey goalie
Rob Peeters (born 1985), Belgian bicycle racer
Rocky Peeters (born 1979), Belgian footballer
Sara Peeters (born 1985), Belgian road bicycle racer
Stef Peeters (born 1992), Belgian footballer
Wilfried Peeters (born 1964), Belgian road bicycle racer
Willem Peeters (born 1953), Belgian road bicycle racer
Willie Peeters (born 1965), Dutch mixed martial artist
Wim Peeters (1925–2011), South African sports shooter
Yannick Peeters (born 1996), Belgian cyclo-cross cyclist

Musicians

Bart Peeters (born 1959), Belgian musician and television presenter
Flor Peeters (1903–1986), Belgian organist and teacher
 (born 1926), Belgian composer, conductor, and clarinetist
Sieneke Peeters (born 1992), Dutch singer

Politicians

Jan Peeters (born 1963), Belgian politician
Kris Peeters (born 1962), Belgian politician
Leo Peeters (born 1950), Belgian politician

Scientists and academics

Harry Peeters (1931–2012), Dutch historian and psychologist
Nand Peeters (1918–1998), Belgian obstetrician and gynecologist
Theo Peeters (born 1943), Belgian neurolinguist

Writers

Barbara Peeters, American film director and screenwriter
Benoît Peeters (born 1956), French comic writer, novelist and critic
Carel Peeters (born 1944), Dutch literary critic, writer and editor
 (born 1957), Belgian writer and former rock musician
Frederik Peeters (born 1974), Swiss comic writer
Koen Peeters (born 1959), Belgian writer

Others

Clive Peeters, a former Australian retailer
Filip Peeters (born 1962), Belgian actor
Peeters (publishing company)

References

Surnames of Belgian origin
Dutch-language surnames
Patronymic surnames
Surnames from given names